Sabatia, the rose gentians, is a genus of about 20 species of flowering plants in the family Gentianaceae, native to eastern and central North America (Nova Scotia west to Wisconsin and New Mexico, and south to Florida and Texas), Central America, and the Caribbean.

They are annual or perennial herbaceous plants growing to 10–130 cm tall, with opposite leaves. The flowers are produced in large cymes at the top of the stems; the flower corolla has 5–12 lobes, colored pink or white, with a contrasting central yellow 'eye'. The fruit is a capsule containing numerous small seeds.

Selected species
Source: USDA, Arkansas Native Plant Society
Sabatia angularis
Sabatia arenicola
Sabatia arkansana
Sabatia bartramii
Sabatia brachiata
Sabatia brevifolia
Sabatia calycina
Sabatia campanulata
Sabatia campestris
Sabatia capitata
Sabatia difformis
Sabatia dodecandra
Sabatia formosa
Sabatia gentianoides
Sabatia grandiflora
Sabatia kennedyana
Sabatia macrophylla
Sabatia quadrangula
Sabatia stellaris

Cultivation and uses
Several species are cultivated as ornamental plants in gardens.

References

External links

 
Gentianaceae genera
Flora of the Eastern United States
Flora of Eastern Canada
Flora of the Northeastern United States
Flora of the Southeastern United States
Taxa named by Michel Adanson